Transient receptor potential cation channel subfamily V member 5 is a calcium channel protein that in humans is encoded by the TRPV5 gene.

Function 
The TRPV5 gene is a member of the transient receptor family and the TRPV subfamily. The calcium-selective channel, TRPV5, encoded by this gene has 6 transmembrane-spanning domains, multiple potential phosphorylation sites, an N-linked glycosylation site, and 5 ANK repeats. This protein forms homotetramers or heterotetramers and is activated by a low internal calcium level.

Both TRPV5 and TRPV6 are expressed in kidney and intestinal epithelial cells. TRPV5 is mainly expressed in kidney epithelial cells, where it plays an important role in the reabsorption of Ca2+, whereas TRPV6 is mainly expressed in the intestine.   The enzyme α-klotho increases kidney calcium reabsorption by stabilizing TPRV5.  Klotho is a beta-glucuronidase-like enzyme that activates TRPV5 by removal of sialic acid.

Clinical significance 

Normally, about 95% to 98% of Ca2+ filtered from the blood by the kidney is reabsorbed by the kidney's renal tubule, mediated by TRPV5. Genetic deletion of TRPV5 in mice leads to Ca2+ loss in the urine, and consequential hyperparathyroidism, and bone loss.

Inhibitors 
 Econazole is a weak inhibitor of both TRPV5 and TRPV6, with an IC50 in the micromolar range
 ZINC17988990 is a potent and selective inhibitor of TRPV5, with an IC50 of 177nM and good selectivity over TRPV6 and the other TRPV channel subtypes.

Interactions 
TRPV5 has been shown to interact with S100A10.

See also 
 TRPV

References

Further reading

External links 
 

Ion channels